Black sage is a common name for several plants and may refer to:

Cordia curassavica, native to tropical America and introduced to Asia and the Pacific
Cordia polycephala, native to the Lesser Antilles and South America
Salvia mellifera, native to California and Baja California

See also
Black sagebrush